Kilmia is the main village of the Guardafui Channel island Abd al Kuri in the island archipelago Socotra, Yemen.

References

Socotra Governorate
Villages in Yemen